Lake Mills is a city in Winnebago County, Iowa, United States. The population was 2,143 at the time of the 2020 census.

History
Lake Mills was platted in part of the northeast quadrant of Center Township in 1869. A gristmill had been built at the site in 1864. Lake Mills was incorporated as a city in 1880.

Geography
Lake Mills is located at  (43.418289, -93.532010).

Demographics

2010 census
As of the census of 2010, there were 2,100 people, 944 households, and 552 families living in the city. The racial makeup of the city was 96.7% White, 0.3% African American, 1.0% Asian, 1.1% from other races, and 0.8% from two or more races. Hispanic or Latino of any race were 3.6% of the population.

There were 944 households, of which 26.2% had children under the age of 18 living with them, 44.5% were married couples living together, 9.6% had a female householder with no husband present, 4.3% had a male householder with no wife present, and 41.5% were non-families. 37.1% of all households were made up of individuals, and 18.5% had someone living alone who was 65 years of age or older. The average household size was 2.16 and the average family size was 2.80.

The median age in the city was 45.3 years. 22.3% of residents were under the age of 18; 6.2% were between the ages of 18 and 24; 21.1% were from 25 to 44; 26.6% were from 45 to 64; and 23.7% were 65 years of age or older. The gender makeup of the city was 47.9% male and 52.1% female.

2000 census
As of the census of 2000, there were 2,140 people, 957 households, and 580 families living in the city. The racial makeup of the city was 98.36% White, 0.05% African American, 0.14% Native American, 0.65% Asian, 0.37% from other races, and 0.42% from two or more races. Hispanic or Latino of any race were 1.64% of the population.

There were 957 households, out of which 27.1% had children under the age of 18 living with them, 48.3% were married couples living together, 8.9% had a female householder with no husband present, and 39.3% were non-families. 36.6% of all households were made up of individuals, and 18.2% had someone living alone who was 65 years of age or older. The average household size was 2.15 and the average family size was 2.78.

21.9% were under the age of 18, 7.7% from 18 to 24, 24.0% from 25 to 44, 23.1% from 45 to 64, and 23.4% were 65 years of age or older. The median age was 43 years. For every 100 females, there were 82.1 males. For every 100 females age 18 and over, there were 80.5 males.

The median income for a household in the city was $33,723, and the median income for a family was $50,345. Males had a median income of $31,898 versus $25,094 for females. The per capita income for the city was $19,155. About 6.0% of families and 8.9% of the population were below the poverty line, including 14.7% of those under age 18 and 5.8% of those age 65 or over.

Education
The Lake Mills Community School District operates local public schools.

Notable people

Terry Branstad (born 1946), Governor of Iowa
Selmer Jackson (1888 – 1971), American stage, film, and television actor; appeared in nearly 400 films
Cody Nickson (born 1985), Marine/Air Force Veteran, Big Brother contestant, Season 19, and The Amazing Race, Season 30 Winner.
Wallace Stegner (1909–1993), historian, writer, Pulitzer Prize winner in 1971
Mike Stensrud (born 1956), NFL player 1979–1989

References

External links

 
City website

Cities in Iowa
Cities in Winnebago County, Iowa
1869 establishments in Iowa